Commissaries general Muhammad Jasin (9 June 1920 - 3 May 2012) was a National Hero of Indonesia and died on 3 May 2012 in RS Polri Kramat Jati. and he was buried in Taman Makam Pahlawan Kalibata. He  received National Hero of Indonesia title, with Bernard Wilhem Lapian, Mas Isman, I Gusti Ngurah Made Agung and Ki Bagus Hadikusumo, by President Joko Widodo on 5 November 2015.

In late 1945, Police Inspector, 'Muhammad Yasin', command a special police corps at Surabaya, named "Pasukan Polisi Istimewa" (Special Police Troops) with the task of disarming remnants of the Japanese Imperial Army and protecting the chief of state and the capital city. Yasin's special troops was fought in the revolution and was the first Indonesian military police unit to engage in the Battle of Surabaya (1945).

References 

1920 births
2012 deaths
National Heroes of Indonesia